Retrograde is a 2004 American science fiction action film directed by Christopher Kulikowski and starring Dolph Lundgren. The film was released theatrically in South Korea on 14 January 2005. It was shot in Italy and Luxembourg.

Plot

When a deadly microorganism threatens to wipe out the entire human race, the only hope for the future of mankind is to send a special team of soldiers back in time to prevent the virus from ever coming into existence. The year is 2204. Humankind is under attack from a fast-spreading super-bug that now threatens to destroy the very fabric of human civilization. The only hope lies with Captain John Foster (Dolph Lundgren) and his elite squad of genetically resistant soldiers. Captain Foster's mission: travel back into the past, and ensure that the first infection never happens. Now, as Captain Foster's team races to save the world, they realize that their actions in the present could yield dire consequences for the future.

Cast

Dolph Lundgren as Captain John Foster
Silvia De Santis as Dr. Renee Diaz
Joe Montana as Dalton
Gary Daniels as Markus
Joe Sagal as Andrew Schrader
Ken Samuels as Captain Robert Davis
David Jean Thomas as Jefferson
Jamie Treacher as Mackenzie
Marco Lorenzini as Bruce Ross
Scott Joseph as Greg
Adrian Sellars as Keith
James Chalke as Vacceri
Nicolas de Pruyssenaer as Ichek
Dean Gregory as Central Command Leader
Derek Kueter as Charley

External links

2004 films
English-language Italian films
English-language Luxembourgian films
Italian science fiction action films
American science fiction action films
2004 science fiction action films
Franchise Pictures films
Luxembourgian science fiction films
2000s English-language films
2000s American films